The Sclerosomatidae are a family of harvestmen with about 1,300 known species.

Name
The name is combined from Ancient Greek skleros "hard" and soma "body".

Genera

 Gagrellinae Thorell, 1889
 Abaetetuba Tourinho-Davis, 2004 (5 species)
 Adungrella Roewer, 1955 (3 species)
 Akalpia Roewer, 1915 (2 species; India and Japan)
 Altobunus Roewer, 1910 (3 species; Celebes and Philippines)
 Amazonesia Soares, 1970 (2 species)
 Antigrella Roewer, 1954 (1 species)
 Aurivilliola Roewer, 1910 (17 species; South and Southeast Asia)
 Azucarella Roewer, 1959 (1 species)
 Bakerinulus Roewer, 1955 (1 species)
 Bastia Roewer, 1910 (3 species; South and Southeast Asia)
 Bastioides Mello-Leitão, 1931 (1 species; South America)
 Baturitia Roewer, 1931 (1 species; Sunda Islands)
 Biceropsis Roewer, 1935 (1 species; Burma)
 Bonthainia Roewer, 1913 (5 species; South and Southeast Asia)
 Bullobunus Roewer, 1910 (7 species; Philippines)
 Caiza Roewer, 1925 (2 species; South America: Ecuador and Argentina)
 Caluga Roewer, 1959 (1 species)
 Carinobius Roewer, 1955 (1 species)
 Carmenia Roewer, 1915 (1 species; Colombia)
 Carmichaelus Roewer, 1929 (1 species; India)
 Ceratobunellus Roewer, 1911 (3 species; India)
 Ceratobunoides Roewer, 1923 (2 species; Sumatra)
 Cervibunus Roewer, 1912 (3 Species; South and Southeast Asia)
 Chasenella Roewer, 1955 (2 species; Borneo)
 Chebabius Roewer, 1935 (1 species; Burma)
 Coonoora Roewer, 1929 (1 species; India)
 Dentobunus Roewer, 1910 (33 species; Southeast Asia)
 Diangathia Roewer, 1955 (1 species)
 Echinobunus Roewer, 1912 (1 species; Java)
 Euceratobunus Roewer, 1923 (1 species; India)
 Eugagrella Roewer, 1910 (25 species; South and Southeast Asia)
 Euzaleptus Roewer, 1911 (4 species; South and Southeast Asia)
 Fesa Roewer, 1953 (1 species)
 Gagrella Stoliczka, 1869 (226 species; Asia)
 Gagrellenna Roewer, 1929 (1 species; India)
 Gagrellina Roewer, 1913 (1 species; Celebes)
 Gagrellissa Roewer, 1931 (1 species; Sunda Islands)
 Gagrellopsis Sato & Suzuki, 1939 (1 species; Japan)
 Gagrellula Roewer, 1910 (67 species; Asia)
 Geaya Roewer, 1910 (78 species; Latin America)
 Globulosoma Martens, 1987 (2 species; Nepal)
 Guaranobunus Ringuelet, 1954 (1 species; Argentina)
 Hamitergum Crawford, 1992 (1 species; Russia)
 Harmanda Roewer, 1910 (15 species; Asia)
 Harmandina Schenkel, 1954 (1 species)
 Hehoa Roewer, 1929 (1 species; India)
 Heterogagrella Roewer, 1954 (2 species; Southeast Asia)
 Hexazaleptus Suzuki, 1966 (1 species)
 Himaldroma Martens, 1987 (2 species; Nepal)
 Himalzaleptus Martens, 1987 (1 species; Nepal)
 Holcobunus Roewer, 1910
 Paratamboicus Mello-Leitão, 1940 (30 species; South America)
 Holmbergiana Mello-Leitão, 1931 (3 species; South America)
 Hologagrella Roewer, 1910 (7 species; Southeast Asia)
 Hypogrella Roewer, 1955 (1 species)
 Jussara Mello-Leitão, 1935 (10 species; South America)
 Koyamaia Suzuki, 1972 (1 species)
 Krusa Goodnight & Goodnight, 1947 (10 species; Mexico)
 Liopagus Chamberlin, 1916 (1 species)
 Marthana Thorell, 1891 (26 species; Southeast Asia)
 Melanopella Roewer, 1931 (3 species; Sunda Islands)
 Melanopula Roewer, 1929 (5 species; South and Southeast Asia)
 Metadentobunus Roewer, 1915 (3 species; Taiwan)
 Metahehoa Suzuki, 1985 (1 species)
 Metasyleus Roewer, 1955 (3 species)
 Metaverpulus Roewer, 1912 (7 species; South Asia)
 Metazaleptus Roewer, 1912 (8 species; South and Southeast Asia)
 Microzaleptus Roewer, 1955 (1 species)
 Munequita Mello-Leitão, 1941 (1 species; Brazil)
 Neogagrella Roewer, 1913 (3 species; South and Southeast Asia)
 Nepalgrella Martens, 1987 (2 species; Nepal)
 Nepalkanchia Martens, 1990 (2 species; Nepal)
 Obigrella Roewer, 1955 (1 species)
 Octozaleptus Suzuki, 1966 (1 species)
 Onostemma Mello-Leitão, 1938 (2 species; Brazil)
 Oobunus Kishida, 1930 (1 species)
 Orissula Roewer, 1955 (1 species)
 Padangrella Roewer, 1954 (1 species)
 Palniella Roewer, 1929 (1 species; India)
 Paradentobunus Roewer, 1915 (1 species; India)
 Paragagrella Roewer, 1912 (5 species; South and Southeast Asia)
 Paragagrellina Schenkel, 1963 (1 species)
 Parageaya Mello-Leitão, 1933 (6 species; Latin America)
 Paraumbogrella Suzuki, 1963 (1 species)
 Paruleptes Soares, 1970 (1 species)
 Pectenobunus Roewer, 1910 (2 species; South America)
 Pergagrella Roewer, 1954 (1 species)
 Pokhara Suzuki, 1970 (7 species; Nepal)
 Prionostemma Pocock, 1903 (114 species; Mexico, Central America, and South America)
 Prodentobunus Roewer, 1923 (4 species; Asia)
 Psammogeaya Mello-Leitão, 1946 (1 species; Uruguay)
 Psathyropus L. Koch, 1878 (40 species; Asia)
 Pseudarthromerus Karsch, 1892 (1 species)
 Pseudogagrella Redikortsev, 1936 (13 species; East Asia)
 Pseudomelanopa Suzuki, 1974 (2 species; East Asia)
 Pseudosystenocentrus Suzuki, 1985 (1 species)
 Romerella Goodnight & Goodnight, 1943 (5 species; Mexico and South America)
 Sarasinia Roewer, 1913 (1 species; Celebes)
 Sataria Roewer, 1915 (3 species; India)
 Scotomenia Thorell, 1889 (1 species; Burma)
 Sericicorpus Martens, 1987 (1 species; Nepal)
 Sinadroma Roewer, 1955 (1 species)
 Syleus Thorell, 1876 (2 species; India)
 Syngagrella Roewer, 1913 (1 species; Celebes)
 Systenocentrus Simon, 1886 (6 species; Southeast and East Asia)
 Tamboicus Roewer, 1912 (3 species; South America)
 Taperina Roewer, 1953 (2 species)
 Tetraceratobunus Roewer, 1915 (3 species; South Asia)
 Toragrella Roewer, 1955 (2 species)
 Trachyrhinus Weed, 1892 (7 species; North America: Mexico and United States)
 Umbogrella Roewer, 1955 (1 species)
 Verpulus Simon, 1901 (13 species; South and Southeast Asia)
 Verrucobunus Roewer, 1931 (3 species; East and Southeast Asia)
 Xerogrella Martens, 1987 (1 species; Nepal)
 Zaleptiolus Roewer, 1955 (4 species; Asia)
 Zaleptulus Roewer, 1955 (3 species)
 Zaleptus Thorell, 1876 (72 species; Asia and Australia)
 Pseudoarthromerus Karsch, 1891 (1 species; Japan)

 Gyantinae Silhavý, 1946
 Gyas Simon, 1879 (1 species; Alps)
 Gyoides Martens, 1982 (6 species; Nepal)
 Rongsharia Roewer, 1957 (3 species; Nepal)

 Globipedidae Kury & Cokendolpher, 2020
 Dalquestia Cokendolpher, 1984 (5 species; North America: Mexico and United States)
 Diguetinus Roewer, 1912 (1 species; Jalisco, Mexico)
 Eurybunus Banks, 1893 (4 species; Western United States)
 Globipes Banks, 1893 (4 species; North America)
 Lanthanopilio Cokendolpher & Cokendolpher, 1984 (1 species; Costa Rica)
 Metopilio Roewer, 1911 (19 species; Mexico and Central America)

 Leiobuninae Banks, 1893
 † Amauropilio Mello-Leitão, 1937 (fossil) (2 species; fossils found in Colorado)
 Cosmobunus Simon, 1879 (5 species; Spain and Mexico)
 Dilophiocara Redikorzev, 1931 (2 species)
 Eumesosoma Cokendolpher, 1980 (6 species; United States)
 Eusclera Roewer, 1910 (2 species; China and India)
 Hadrobunus Banks, 1900 (2 species; United States)
 Leiobunum C.L.Koch, 1839 (126 species - 2 extinct fossils; worldwide)
 Leuronychus Banks, 1900 (2 species; North America)
 Microliobunum Roewer, 1912 (2 species; Middle East)
 Micronelima Schenkel, 1938 (1 species; Spain)
 Nelima Roewer, 1910 (44 species; worldwide)
 Paranelima Caporiacco, 1938 (6 species; Mexico and Central America)
 Schenkeliobunum Starega, 1964 (1 species)
 Togwoteeus Roewer, 1952 (1 species; United States)

 Sclerosomatinae Simon, 1879
 Astrobunus Thorell, 1876 (12 species; Europe)
 Granulosoma Martens, 1973 (1 species)
 Homalenotus C.L.Koch, 1839 (13 species; Southern Europe and North Africa)
 Mastobunus Simon, 1879 (2 species; Southern Europe and North Africa)
 Metasclerosoma Roewer, 1912 (5 species; Italy)
 Pseudastrobunus Martens, 1973 (1 species)
 Pseudohomalenotus Caporiacco, 1935 (1 species; the Karakoram)
 Pygobunus Roewer, 1957 (2 species; Japan)
 Umbopilio Roewer, 1956 (1 species)

Footnotes

References
 Joel Hallan's Biology Catalog: Sclerosomatidae

Harvestman families